Samuel Lawrence Kelley is an American playwright and Distinguished Service Professor Emeritus, Communication Studies and Africana Studies, State University of New York College at Cortland. He has also organized the SUNY Cortland Gospel Music Festival since 1985.

Education
Kelley earned a B.A. in speech and drama from the University of Arkansas at Pine Bluff; M.A. in speech from the University of Arkansas at Fayetteville; and the MFA in play-writing from the Yale School of Drama. He also holds a Ph.D. in speech, with a concentration in radio-TV-film, from the University of Michigan.

Works

Plays

Pill Hill
Habeas Corpus
The Blue Vein Society
Faith, Hope and Charity: The Story of Mary McLeod Bethune
Thruway Diaries
Beautiful Game
A Hero For McBride
White Chocolate
Retirement Blues
No Hidin' Place
God Is My Witness

References

External links
 http://www2.cortland.edu/bulletin/issues/bulletin-10-11/bulletin-5-oct-25.dot
 http://www.wix.com/juliotorressantana/sams-plays
 http://web.cortland.edu/gospelchoir/index.html

1946 births
Living people
University of Arkansas alumni
University of Arkansas at Pine Bluff alumni
Yale School of Drama alumni
University of Michigan alumni
State University of New York faculty